Christ's Church, Ürümqi is a Protestant church located in Tianshan District of Ürümqi, Xinjiang, China.

History 
In February 1945, Li Kaihuan, a member of the OMF International, and his wife Zhai Mingxia, a member of the Baptists, went to Xinjiang to preach. On August 26, Li held a general meeting of all believers and began preparations for the establishment of the church in Xinjiang. The Church Building Committee was built in March 1946 and began to raise funds for the construction of the church. Zhang Zhizhong, the then Governor of Xinjiang, also donated money.

Li died in 1959 and was buried in Dongshan Ecological Park. His wife continued religious activities. In 1966, the Cultural Revolution broke out, religious activities were forced to stop and the church was used as an electronic research station. After the 3rd Plenary Session of the 11th Central Committee of the Chinese Communist Party, the policy of religious freedom was implemented. The church was returned to the church in 1985.

References 

Churches in Xinjiang
Tourist attractions in Xinjiang
1945 establishments in China
Protestant churches in China
Churches completed in 1945
Buildings and structures in Ürümqi